The Wellington Service Rifle Association (or WSRA) is New Zealand's oldest active service rifle club.

Competitions

WSRA holds a series of annual 'themed' competitions. The most popular attract competitors from around the country and sometimes from across the Tasman. WSRA are dedicated to the safe, competitive use of military firearms.

 Charles Upham Memorial Cavalry Champions Belt (military service rifles)
 Service Challenge (Incorporating the CU with shotgun and pistol events)
 Shotgun Special
 Best of Continental - ( FN FAL, Mauser rifles, Nagant, Swiss K31, AK-47 etc.)
 Best of Commonwealth - (Lee–Enfield, Ross rifle, L1A1 rifle)
 .22 rimfire action shoots Tactical Precision Match
 ANZAC Day
 Carbine Day
 Civilian Marksmanship Program
 Bolt Action Day
 Best of American - M1 carbine, Garand Rifle, M14 rifle, AR-15, Colt 1911 & Shotgun.
 Semi Auto day - AR-15, Steyr AUG, SKS carbine, AK-47,  M14 rifle, M1 Garand
 Two Gun (Shotgun and rifle)
 Red Star day ( Nagant, SKS carbine, AK-47 rifles)
 .303 Day
 3 Gun
 Long range steel plate shoots out to 1000 yards
 Din Collings Trophy (military service rifle with iron sights and bayonet)

Memberships
WSRA is a member of the New Zealand Service Rifle Association (NZSRA). Before the establishment of NZSRA, WSRA was an active member of the  Council of Licensed Firearms Owners (COLFO). Since NZSRA's establishment WSRA members are members of COLFO via NZSRA.

External links
Official Site

Sports clubs in New Zealand